John Stephen Major Jones (22 April 1930 – 9 September 2011) was a British rower. He competed at the 1952 Summer Olympics in Helsinki with the men's coxless four where they came fourth.

References

1930 births
2011 deaths 
British male rowers
Olympic rowers of Great Britain
Rowers at the 1952 Summer Olympics
People from Church Stretton
European Rowing Championships medalists